Simrothiella is a genus of solenogasters, shell-less, worm-like, marine mollusks.

Species
 Simrothiella abysseuropaea Salvini-Plawen, 2004
 Simrothiella comorensis Todt & Salvini-Plawen, 2003
 Simrothiella digitoradulata Salvini-Plawen, 2004
 Simrothiella margaritacea (Koren & Danielssen, 1877)
 Simrothiella vasconiensis Salvini-Plawen, 2008
Species brought into synonymy
 Simrothiella borealis (Odhner, 1920): synonym of Kruppomenia borealis Odhner, 1920
 Simrothiella minima (Nierstrasz, 1903): synonym of Kruppomenia minima Nierstrasz, 1903 (currently placed in genus Kruppomenia)
 Simrothiella rhynchota Salvini-Plawen, 1978: synonym of Kruppomenia rhynchota (Salvini-Plawen, 1978)
 Simrothiella sarsi (Koren & Danielssen, 1877): synonym of Dorymenia sarsii (Koren & Danielssen, 1877)
 Simrothiella schizoradulata Salvini-Plawen, 1978: synonym of Plawenia schizoradulata (Salvini-Plawen, 1978)

References

 Vaught, K.C.; Tucker Abbott, R.; Boss, K.J. (1989). A classification of the living Mollusca. American Malacologists: Melbourne. ISBN 0-915826-22-4. XII, 195 pp

External links
 Pilsbry, H. A. & Sharp, B. (1897-1898). Manual of conchology, structural and systematic, with illustrations of the species. Ser. 1. Vol. 17: Scaphopoda. pp i-xxxii, 1-348, pls 1-48. Philadelphia, published by the Conchological Section, Academy of Natural Sciences. 
 Gofas, S.; Le Renard, J.; Bouchet, P. (2001). Mollusca. in: Costello, M.J. et al. (eds), European Register of Marine Species: a check-list of the marine species in Europe and a bibliography of guides to their identification. Patrimoines Naturels. 50: 180-213

Solenogastres